Lisa Hilton may refer to:

 Lisa Hilton (writer) (born 1974), British writer of history books
 Lisa Hilton (musician), American jazz pianist, composer and bandleader